Judge Martin may refer to:

Beverly B. Martin (born 1955), judge of the United States Court of Appeals for the Eleventh Circuit
Boyce F. Martin Jr. (1935–2016), judge of the United States Court of Appeals for the Sixth Circuit
George Ewing Martin (1857–1948), judge of the United States Court of Customs Appeals
Isaac Jack Martin (1908–1966), judge of the United States Court of Customs and Patent Appeals
James Loren Martin (1846–1915), judge of the United States District Court for the District of Vermont
James Robert Martin Jr. (1909–1984), judge of the United States District Court for the District of South Carolina, and for the Eastern and Western Districts of South Carolina
John Donelson Martin Sr. (1883–1962), judge of the United States Court of Appeals for the Sixth Circuit
John S. Martin Jr. (born 1935), judge of the United States District Court for the Southern District of New York

See also
J. Thomas Marten (born 1951), judge of the United States District Court for the District of Kansas
Justice Martin (disambiguation)